Bennetts Lane Jazz Club, a live jazz performance music venue in Melbourne, Australia, was located at the end of its namesake lane off Little Lonsdale Street from 1992 to 2017. New owners planned to reopen the club in new premises in Flinders Lane, and open in the 2020s.

History
Entrepreneur Michael Tortoni opened the club on 27 November 1992, and added a second performance space in an adjoining building to the north called the Jazz Lab in January 2000 for the Melbourne International Jazz Festival. The club has hosted local, national and international musicians and was the flagship venue for the Melbourne Jazz Festival for many years. Lonely Planet called it "The World's Best Jazz Club" and it won the Best Venue Award at the Australian Jazz Awards in 2003 and 2004, the award being discontinued thereafter.

The venue closed on 15 June 2015, following the sale of the real estate assets by Tortoni for $10 million to a developer intent on building an apartment complex on the site. Tortoni then sold the intellectual property of the club, including the employment of long-time manager Megan Evans, to entrepreneur David Marriner in June 2015.

Marriner negotiated with the developer to retain the club at its original site until they were ready to begin works. The club reopened 10 weeks after initially closing, on August 27, 2015, with a performance by Yvette Johansson, and an updated interior, air conditioning, and sound system. During this time Marriner enlisted Evans' design studio, Brolly Studios, to design the new club at its future location in Flinders Lane, behind the Grand Hyatt, the plans for which were approved in 2016. The studios closed to allow space for the developer to install a display suite, and Flipboard Cafe, also onsite, continued to operate. Due to the club still operating, the opportunity to reconsider the design allowed Marriner and Evans to update their design. The new design was approved by the Melbourne City Council in 2019. The club vacated the Bennetts Lane site mid-February 2017, and closed on the 8th.

Since its closure David Marriner and his team have been awaiting the go-ahead by the Grand Hyatt land owners to begin construction. As of February 2020 there was no news of construction or projected opening dates. On November 13, 2022, the owners seem to have made the decision to put their efforts on hold for the time being.

Michael Tortoni opened a new jazz club in April 2017, "The Jazzlab", in Leslie St, Brunswick.

Performers
Musicians who have performed at the club include:
Allan Browne
The Cat Empire
 Hayley Clare
Harry Connick Jr.
Chick Corea
Kurt Elling
Sandy Evans
Renee Geyer
Herbie Hancock
Abdullah Ibrahim
Andrea Keller
Branford Marsalis
Wynton Marsalis
Brad Mehldau
The Necks
Esperanza Spalding
Justin Timberlake
Prince.

See also
Culture of Melbourne
Village Vanguard

References

Jazz clubs in Australia
Music venues in Melbourne
Music venues completed in 1992